Highland is the name of several locations in Wisconsin:

Highland, Douglas County, Wisconsin, a town
Highland, Iowa County, Wisconsin, a town
Highland, Wisconsin, a village in Iowa County
Highland Beach, Wisconsin, an unincorporated community
Highland Park, Wisconsin, an unincorporated community